The Jutlandic Air Defence Regiment was a Danish Army Air defence regiment. On 1 November 1974 it was merged into North Jutland Artillery Regiment.

History
The regiment was established on 3 November 1951. When 14 AA were separated from Zealand Air Defence Regiment.

The regiment traces its history even further back, through Zealand Air Defence Regiment, as it is heir to the old Kystartilleriregimentet.

Structure
  2nd Air Defence Battalion 
  3nd Air Defence Battalion
  14th Air Defence Battalion, Part of Jutland Division

Names of the regiment

References

Sources
 Luftværns-Artilleri-Foreningen ~ Her er informationer om luftværnsregimenter i Danmark
 
 
 Lærebog for Hærens Menige, Hærkommandoen, marts 1960

Danish Army regiments
Military units and formations established in 1951
Military of Denmark
1951 establishments in Denmark